The 2010 Twin Anchors Invitational was held Oct. 1-4. 2010 at the Vernon Curling Club in Vernon, British Columbia. It was held on Week 4 of the 2010-11 World Curling Tour. The purse for the men's event was $37,000 and for the women's, $35,000. The winning men's team was the Kevin Koe rink, which received $8,000 and the women's winner was Cheryl Bernard's rink, which won $7,500.

Men's

Teams
 Andrew Bilesky
 Miles Craig 
 Andrey Drozdov
 Pete Fenson
 Rick Folk
 Jon Gardner 
 Sean Geall
 Tyrel Griffith
 Jason Gunnlaugson
 Aron Herrick
 Dean Horning
 Kevin Koe
 Lee Dong-Keun
 Mike McEwen
 Dave Merklinger
 Sven Michel
 Bryan Miki
 Yusuke Morozumi
 Steve Petryk
 Brent Pierce
 Jeff Richard
 Tobin Senum
 Bob Ursel
 Brent Yamada

Playoffs

Women's

Teams
 Jerri Pat Armstrong-Smith
 Nicole Backe
 Cheryl Bernard
 Jen Fewster
 Diane Foster
 Satsuki Fujisawa
 Jennifer Gerow
 Tracey Jones
 Jessie Kaufman 
 Patti Knezevic
 Kelley Law 
 Kristy Lewis
 Allison MacInnes 
 Marla Mallett 
 Anna Ohmiya 
 Desiree Owen
 Liudmila Privivkova
 Brette Richards
 Casey Scheidegger 
 Kelly Scott 
 Desiree Schmidt 
 Anna Sidorova
 Karla Thompson
 Wang Bingyu

Playoffs

External links
Official site

Twin Anchors Invitational, 2010
Sport in Vernon, British Columbia